Altanshiree is a sum (district) of Dornogovi Province in southeastern Mongolia. In 2018, they began their construction for their first oil refinery.

Settlements 
 Delgerkhet

References 

Districts of Dornogovi Province